Isaac Andrew Fletcher (born 1 June 2002) is an English professional footballer who plays for Middlesbrough as a midfielder.

Career
Fletcher began his career with Middlesbrough at under-10 level before turning professional in November 2020. He moved on loan to Hartlepool United in January 2022. In February 2022, Fletcher scored his first professional goal in a 2–1 win at Colchester United.

On 26 August 2022, Fletcher signed for National League club Scunthorpe United on loan until January 2023, however he was recalled early, on 28 September 2022.

Personal life
He is the older brother of Oscar Fletcher who plays for Hartlepool's youth team.

Career statistics

References

2002 births
Living people
English footballers
Association football midfielders
Middlesbrough F.C. players
Hartlepool United F.C. players
Scunthorpe United F.C. players
English Football League players